Dulkhan (also Romanized as Dūlkhān) is a village in Bizaki Rural District, Golbajar District, Chenaran County, Razavi Khorasan Province, Iran. As of the 2006 census, its population was 110, in 28 families.

References 

Populated places in Chenaran County